Viani is an Italian surname. Notable people with the surname include:

Alan Viani, American labor leader
Antonio Maria Viani (born c. 1540), Italian Renaissance painter and carver
Domenico Maria Viani (1668–1711), Italian Baroque painter
Giovanni Maria Viani (1636–1700), Italian Baroque painter
Giuseppe Viani (1909–1969), Italian footballer and manager
Osvaldo Gnocchi-Viani (1837–1917), Italian journalist and a member of the First International
Riccardo Vianello Raimondo Viani (1922-2010), Italian actor, comedian and television host
Serafino Viani (1768 – 1803), Italian painter and patriot from Reggio Emilia

Italian-language surnames